is a Japanese comedian who performs boke of the double act Hanamaru-Daikichi Hakata, in which his partner is Daikichi Hakata. After working with Fukuoka Yoshimoto, he joined Yoshimoto Creative Agency (Tokyo Yoshimoto) since 2005.

Biography
Hakata was born as the eldest son of a family who runs construction work. He graduated Takamiya Junior High School and Fukuoka University attached Ohoro High School, and recommended entrance to Fukuoka University engineering department (but dropped out later). In addition, Hakata's name of Taka at the Rakugo Study Group where he enrolled is "Fukufukutei Saron". When he consulted with a person familiar with fortune telling by former employee of Fukuoka Yoshimoto, his former name was told to rename it to "Haramaru Hakata", and the name of the combination was renamed to Hanamaru-Daikichi Hakata. Although he was sold so much in Fukuoka, Cunning and Hiroshi selling in Tokyo, moved the base to Tokyo from 2005 and lives in Yokohama City, Kanagawa Prefecture Hakata's first entry in the preliminary round of R-1 Grand Prix held from December the same year, he advanced to the final. At the finals, he performed the "monster style" of Kiyoshi Kodama and won R-1 Grand Prix 2006. Hanamaru Hakata sometimes studied in Yoshimoto Shin Kongi although it was a short period in 2000.

Personal life
His main nickname is Hanamaru. Some fans and entertainers called him  from his real name. Hakata started calling Okazaki-san Ameagari Kesshitai, Toru Hanahara of the death squadron, Hanamaru himself is grateful, that is also pleased from his family. At Ame Talk, he has appeared to food and drink performers such as "Onega Artist" and "Potato Salad Entertainer", "Frying Entertainer" every time, and it is sticking to food as "Only there is the only one winning Okichi-sensei" strongly, he mentioned his own wedding ceremony at the restaurant in Fukuoka city.

Hakata is a fan of Fukuoka SoftBank Hawks and Avispa Fukuoka. From the time he was active in Fukuoka with the Hawks' players, both public and private exchanges were deep, and when Hawks won the 2011 series in Japan, they participated in a beer sponsoring a celebration party. Hakata catches balls and throws on his left. In the past, he was a fan of Hiroshima Toyo Carp until Hawks became the director of Fukuoka Yoshimoto of the time even after Hawks came to Fukuoka until it was turned into Hawks fans semi-compulsively. In his high school days, Hakata have subscribed to "Monthly Carp Fan", about Tomonori Maeda who made his professional baseball debut the same year as his entertainment debut, even now in 2013 "I can not say it with a loud voice but I like the most A good player is Maeda."

He profess as saying that the youth was "Nagabuchi was one piece" and is also a fan of Tsuyoshi Nagabuchi, and has been traveling to Nagabuchi's new music announcement convention, etc. even after Tokyo, in the Ame-talk and "Tsuyoshi Nagabuchi" performances and talk about episodes with the singer, and in August 2015, "Tsuyoshi Nagabuchi 100,000 All Night - Live 2015 In Fuji Mountain Foot" with Parachute Butai, Goriken and others to see the concert.

Family life
With Hakata, he was acquainted with a friend who came as a customer when working part-time in an izakaya in Nakasu, and later married in 1998. They have two daughters. Momoko Okazaki, their second daughter, was a member of the female idol group Sakura Gakuin. Also, Hakata once appeared on Ame-talk "Daughter Deredele Entertainer", appealing his daughter liked (broadcast on 15 March 2012).

Impressions
Batten Arakawa
Hachimaru's Eighteen. When doing this imitation, "Ban Muromigawa" may also be mentioned. Although it is almost unknown except in Kyushu, it is said that Hakata is a so-called "regional limited neta", while in Fukuoka, local people who are imitating this have been infiltrated from Kiyama Ki and are considered as representative of him.
Kiyoshi Kodama
Many stories from Panel Quiz Attack 25. Sometimes lines such as "Attack Chance" and "Sono Tōri" are entered. There is also a story called "Kiyoshi Kodama no aiueo Sakubun" (contents are Panel Quiz Attack 25).
Jay Kabira
Mimicry of narration that is apt to be in Sharam Q audition of Asayan (TV Tokyo). Hakata would be a Hawks player unexpectedly while announcing the starting members of Japan national football team.He also manage Jon Kabira, the elderbrother of Jay.
Jon Kabira
Junichi Teshima (weather forecaster)
Teshima himself has appeared almost outside of the broadcasting area of Television Nishinippon Corporation, and it has become almost one of "local limited contents" as well.
Fukuoka SoftBank Hawks director Sadaharu Oh
Corner in the Fuji Television series Tonneruzu no Minasan no Okage deshita "Komaka sugite Tsutawaranai Monomane Senshuken 8".
President Yoshinori Kita of Tokado (same as above)
Yoshiro Yokomine (same as above)
Monta Mino
TV Tokyo Buchinuki showcased in 2005 at Thursday Gokuraku Tombo's "Oni no Tsubo Gassen".
Phil Jackson
NBA's name coach. He showed off only once on Tetsuwan momochi. There was no impersonation of talking only with appearance and reaction.
Sho Tobari
Tonneruzu no Minasan no Okage deshita "Komaka sugite Tsutawaranai Monomane Senshuken 13".
Sanshōtei Yumenosuke
Tonneruzu no Minasan no Okage deshita at "Komaka sugite Tsutawaranai Monomane Senshuken 19" and Sanshōtei hosted the chair for many years, and show off the monster of the state of the host of the "Washoi Million Summer Festival" in Kitakyushu City.
Hiroshi Minohara

Relationship with Kiyoshi Kodama
During the activity in Fukuoka Hakata's Kiyoshi Kodama impression was shown off. In November 2005 he participated in the corner Tonneruzu no Minasan no Okage deshita in the "Komaka sugite Tsutawaranai Monomane Senshuken 6". I won the prize in Kodama's impression. Even at "Zenkoku Taikai" broadcast on 29 December, Hakata won again with his impression and got a prize of 1 million yen. In 2006, he won the R-1 Grand Prix and won Kodama's impression (aiueo composition "a line" to "ta line"), won the trophy and the prize money 5 million yen.

Hakata initially co-started with Kodama at the ''Attack 25 Entertainer Competition" broadcast on 3 September 2006.

As an impersonator of Kodama, he appeared in the Japan Professional Football League (JnLeague) first section held on 25 August 2007 Kawasaki Frontale vs. Gamba Osaka won the attraction promotion campaign "Attack! 25th" by Kawasaki. Also in Fukuoka City there is the J. League Club Avispa Fukuoka and its support is also Hanamaru hesitated to request from Kawasaki, but this year Fukuoka is in the second division and he will not play against Kawasaki directly, so decide the appearance he explained on his blog.

As a respect for Kodama, he uses the right hand when declaring "Attack Chance", but Hanamaru uses his left hand. In 16 May 2011, when Kodama died of stomach cancer, he said that he was derived from being a counterfeit and was also a sign of respect for Kodama himself. Only when appeared in "Attack 25" mentioned above, Kodama's own proposal realized declaration with both hands with Kodama and Hanamaru. On the funeral of Kodama, which ran on 21 May, he attended with Daikichi.

Regarding impersonation after Kodama's death, "I received from Kodama" Hakata thought it would not be long beforehand. "I received that it was meant to mean trying something new rather than being angry." as thought that the seal was also considered.

Filmography

TV programmes

Current appearances
 Regular

 Quasi-regular/irregular appearances

 Former appearances

Radio
 Current appearances

 Former appearances

TV dramas

Internet dramas

Films

Japanese dub

Animated films

Advertisements

CD

Stage

Bibliography

References

Notes

Sources

External links
  

Japanese impressionists (entertainers)
People from Fukuoka
1970 births
Living people